Jim Williams (March 3, 1919 – May 31, 2007) was an American basketball coach and college athletics administrator. He served the head coach of the Colorado State University men's basketball program for 26 seasons, from 1954 to 1980. Williams succeeded Bill Strannigan following the program's first ever NCAA Tournament appearance. During his tenure he amassed 352 wins, the most for any Division I college coach in Colorado history.  His teams made a total of four NCAA Tournament and two NIT appearances.  In 1969 he took the Rams to the Elite Eight of the NCAA Tournament, beating arch-rival Colorado in the Sweet Sixteen before losing a tightly contested game to Drake University.

Williams also served as the school's athletic director during the construction of Moby Arena and Hughes Stadium and the school's entrance into the Western Athletic Conference.  

Following his dismissal in 1980 Williams continued to attend CSU games where he was given his own special courtside seat.  Williams was also among the first entrants in CSU Sports Hall of Fame.

On May 31, 2007, Williams died at the age of 92.

References

1910s births
2007 deaths
American men's basketball coaches
Basketball coaches from Idaho
Colorado State Rams athletic directors
Colorado State Rams men's basketball coaches
People from Malad City, Idaho
Snow Badgers men's basketball coaches